Effingham is a hamlet on 12 Mile Creek, in the northern part of the Town of Pelham in Ontario, Canada. Located on the Niagara Escarpment, it has few roads which wind through the Escarpment's forests.

Like the neighbouring community of St. Johns in Thorold, Effingham sits on the edge of Short Hills Provincial Park. The St. Johns Conservation Area, maintained by the Niagara Peninsula Conservation Authority, is located nearby.

Effingham began as a small Quaker settlement early in Niagara's history. Situated in the Short Hills of Pelham, it owed its beginnings to David Secord, brother-in-law to Laura Secord, who had arrived shortly after 1783. The patent issued on 8 July 1799. The tract was composed mainly of wooded hills divided by spring-fed streams. Secord harnessed the water power of the fast flowing streams to run a grist mill at what has since become the neighbouring hamlet of St. Johns, only the second mill to be built in Upper Canada.

Secord had cleared 10 acres (4 ha) and planted apple trees, which were already bearing fruit, when the Loyalist and Quaker Samuel Beckett arrived on the scene. Beckett was to be the forerunner of many Quakers who would settle in Pelham. Secord sold his entire grant to Beckett on 13 October 1809 for GBP£687/10s. Beckett proceeded to build a saw mill. Besides the grist mill, a woollen factory and fulling mill are recorded, and eventually the bustling milling centre became known as "Beckett's Mills". The original Beckett home is still in good condition, and its present owner is only its fourth since 1795.

The fast running streams of the Twelve Mile Creek system were a source of power and the soil was excellent for farming and growing wheat. The grist mills of Beckett's Mills and St. Johns served the farmers throughout the region. In 1850, Beckett's Mills was renamed "Effingham" and a post office was established. Effingham boasted a general store, post office, a Quaker church, a blacksmith shop and a carriage shop. In spite of exterior forces, such as the first Welland Canal and the railways by-passing St. Johns, Effingham was still able to be a busy milling community. By 1854, however, the effects of the second Welland canal, more railways and American imported wheat from Ohio forced the community to change to cash crops of fruit, vegetables and dairy products. Effingham slowly declined as a regional centre.

Today, the mills are gone. Fierce storms in 1935 washed out the mill dams and sent a flood of water through the valley, destroying many bridges. Of the many millponds where ducks and geese once paddled, only broken-down mill races are still to be found.

The poem "Effingham" by Brown from 1912 captures the spirit of the hamlet:

External links
Effingham at Geographical Names of Canada
 The Voice of Pelham - Pelham & Effingham Community Newspaper
 Short Hills Nature Sanctuary

Neighbourhoods in Fort Erie, Ontario
Neighbourhoods in Pelham, Ontario